Jane Rogers (born 21 July 1952) is a British novelist, editor, scriptwriter, lecturer, and teacher. She is best known for her novels Mr. Wroe's Virgins and The Voyage Home. In 1994 Rogers was elected a Fellow of the Royal Society of Literature.

Early life
Rogers was born in London on 21 July 1952. She was educated at Oxford High School, a private girls school in Oxford. She then matriculated into New Hall, Cambridge to study English. She graduated Bachelor of Arts (BA) in 1974. She went on to complete a Postgraduate Certificate in Education (PGCE) at the University of Leicester in 1976.

She now lives in Banbury.

Career
Her novel The Testament of Jessie Lamb was longlisted for the Man Booker Prize and won the Arthur C. Clarke Award.

In November 2015, her adaptation of Dodie Smith's I Capture the Castle was broadcast on BBC Radio 4. It starred Romola Garai as Cassandra and Toby Jones as Mortmain.

Bibliography
 Separate Tracks (1983, Faber)
 Her Living Image (1984, Faber)
 The Ice is Singing (1987, Faber)
 Mr. Wroe's Virgins (1991, Faber)
 Promised Lands (1995, Faber)
 Island (1999, Little Brown)
 The Voyage Home (2004, Little Brown)
 The Testament of Jessie Lamb (2011, Sandstone)
 Conrad and Eleanor (2016, Faber)

Prizes and honours
1985 - Won Somerset Maugham Award Somerset Maugham Award (for Her Living Image, published 1984)
1994 – Elected a Fellow of the Royal Society of Literature.
2011 – Longlisted for The Man Booker Prize for Fiction (for The Testament of Jessie Lamb) 
2011 – Won the Arthur C. Clarke Award (for The Testament of Jessie Lamb)

References

External links

 
BBC radio plays at ukonline

1952 births
Living people
20th-century English novelists
Fellows of the Royal Society of Literature
People educated at Oxford High School, England
Alumni of New Hall, Cambridge
Writers from London
British women novelists